Hantu is the Malay and Indonesian word for spirit or ghost, sometimes it is also the Tagalog word for ghost . In modern usage it generally means spirits of the dead but has also come to refer to any legendary invisible being, such as demons. In its traditional context the term also referred to animistic nature spirits or ancestral souls. The word is derived from Proto-Malayo-Polynesian *qanitu and Proto-Austronesian *qaNiCu. Cognates in other Austronesian languages include the Micronesian aniti, Lio language nitu, Yami anito, Taivoan alid, Seediq and Atayal utux, Bunun hanitu or hanidu, Polynesian aitu or atua, and Tsou hicu among the Formosan languages. In terms of concept and place in traditional folklore, it is most similar to the Filipino anito.

Types
Aside from generic spirits of the dead, there exist various forms of Hantu including both the benign and malevolent.

 Hantu Air: spirit inhabiting the water
 Hantu Beruk: ape demon
 Hantu Belian: tiger spirit
 Hantu Musang: a civet cat spirit that is invoked in a game of possession
 Hantu Pusaka: grave demon
 Hantu Raya: great demon. This hantu is considered the strongest among evil spirits of the jungles of Malaysia, and takes the appearance of its owner. 
 Hantu Rimba: deep-forest demon
 Hantu Tinggi: tall hantu that is associated with trees

See also
Ghosts in Malay culture
Anito

References

Demons
Malay ghost myth
Ghosts
Malaysian mythology
Indonesian legendary creatures
Jinn
Austronesian spirituality
Nature spirits